Spyros Pomonis (14 February 1944 – 28 July 2020) was a Greek professional footballer who played as a forward and a later manager.

Club career

Early years
Pomonis since he was young played football with the children of his neighborhood, at the sandlot behind the Rizoupoli Stadium. In 1959 Kleanthis Maropoulos saw him there suggested that he join the infrastructure departments of AEK Athens. Thus, at the age of 15, little Pomonis joined the club's infrastructure departments and was a member of the youth teams of the AEK that won many Championships in the early 1960s, under the historical director Dimitris Tragos, having teammates sucha as Giorgos Karafeskos, Nikos Sevastopoulos, Stelios Konstantinidis, Giorgos Lavaridis, Stefanos Theodoridis, Lefteris Istorios, Kostas Triantafyllou, Dimitis Liakouris and Michalis Simigdalas.

AEK Athens
Pomonis was promoted to the men's team earlier than his teammates as he impressed with his abilities. He made his debut in the first team on 12 March 1961 in a 0–0 away draw against Aris, being the youngest player to ever compete with the club. He was a player with great technical skills and competing in the position of the left winger, he caused the admiration of the fans by running up and down the opposing defenses. In December 1967 in the 1–4 away victory over Olympiacos, he continuously dribbled and ridiculed his personal opponent, Orestis Pavlidis and even the attempts by the captain of the team, Andreas Stamatiadis to "admonish" him during the match in order to simplify his way of playing for AEK to reach an even wider dominance instead proved ultimately fruitless. The young Pomonis eventually insisted on humiliating his opponent at all costs, scoring once AEK missed the opportunity for a wider victory against the red and whites and Pavlidis took the decision that the role of referee suited him better, by retiring as a footballer.

He was one of the main players of the team that won second place in the Balkans Cup in 1967, losing only in the final by Fenerbahçe. He was also a regular in the squad that reached the quarter-finals of the European Cup in 1969. On 15 February 1970 he shined at the derby against Panathinaikos at Leoforos Alexandras Stadium scoring the winner at the end of the first half. He achieved a hat-trick on 13 September 1970 in a Cup match against the lower-tier club Kipoupoli, where they triumphed by winning 20–0. He scored once in a European match, on 15 September 1971 the goal that opened the score at the 14th minute against Internazionale at San Siro in the 4–1 defeat for the first round of the European Cup. He had a decisive contribution to AEK winning 2 Championships and 2 Cups. On 4 February 1973, he scored for the last time in the yellow and black shirt in a league match in Kavala at home when he equalized 1-1 five minutes before the end. He played his last game for AEK at Peristeri Stadium on 20 May 1973 in the away win defeat Atromitos.

Later career
In the summer of 1973, he left AEK and played for a season at Ethnikos Piraeus, where he ended his career as a professional footballer. In the summer of 1974 he was transferred to the team of Saronikos, as a veteran he competed in the amateur local championship of Piraeus.

International career

Pomonis played with Greece U19 in the 1962 UEFA European Under-18 Championship. He also played with the Olympic team on 8 April 1964, in an impressive 4–1 home win over Great Britain for the pre-Olympic tournament ahead of the 1964 Summer Olympics.

He also had 4 caps with Greece scoring once. On 4 March 1972 he scored his only goal at the 55th minute of a friendly match against Italy at Karaiskakis Stadium in a 2–1 win, when after a corner execution by Domazos, Antoniadis with a header laid the ball to him who scored.

Managerial career
Completing his football career, Pomonis involved with coaching and in particular with infrastructure departments, starting at AO Pera Club. He was in 1987 season on the bench of APS Zakynthos for a season. The chronic pathogenicity of Greek football and the foreign situations that prevail in it even in the small sections of the teams disappointed him to such an extent that he gave up any involvement in football.

Personal life
Pomonis had always remained a member of the Veterans Association of AEK Athens and was almost always present at their events. He died on 28 July 2020 after long-term health problems.

Honours

AEK Athens
Alpha Ethniki: 1967–68, 1970–71
Greek Cup: 1963–64, 1965–66

References

External links

1944 births
2020 deaths
Greece international footballers
AEK Athens F.C. players
Ethnikos Piraeus F.C. players
Super League Greece players
Association football forwards
Greek football managers
Footballers from Athens
Greek footballers